WIZS (1450 AM) is a radio station licensed to Henderson, North Carolina, United States.  The station is currently owned by Rose Farm And Rentals, Inc.

References

External links

IZS
Full service radio stations in the United States